The following are the national records in track cycling in Ukraine maintained by the Ukrainian Cycling Federation (FCU).

Men

Women

References

External links
FCU website

Ukraine
records
Track cycling
track cycling